The Digital Future Coalition (DFC) was a US-based copyright advocacy organization established in 1995.  Founded by leading scholars and activists in the library and public interest world, DFC was a precursor to organizations like Public Knowledge and the Library Research Coalition.  The organization emerged from a round table of legal scholars and library associations members convened by Peter Jaszi in fall of 1995 to review the Clinton Administration's White Paper on Intellectual Property and the National Information Infrastructure, authored by Bruce Lehman.  That White Paper proposed a variety of new legislative approaches within copyright, generally broadening its scope and reach, and the roundtable discussion brought forward the notion of establishing a lobbying group to counter the commercial copyright interests' lobbying groups.

The DFC had at its peak at least 42 institutional members, drawn from library associations, scholarly societies, public interest groups, and IT-related commercial entities.  The organization was active in the legislative debates and lobbying surrounding the Digital Millennium Copyright Act, the Copyright Term Extension Act, and proposed database protection legislation, and was instrumental in inserting limiting provisions and exceptions into the DMCA and CTEA, and in defeating the proposed database protection legislation. (See Database and Collections of Information Misappropriation Act, H.R. 3261, 108th Congress.)

Significant reports, comments, etc. 
 Comments of the Digital Future Coalition, Aug./Sept. 2000, Submitted to the U.S. Copyright Office, Pursuant to Sec. 104 of the Digital Millennium Copyright Act, in Response to Request for Comments, 65 F.R. 35673.
 "Statement of the Digital Future Coalition Regarding W.I.P.O. Implementing Legislation", 1997.
 Statement of Intended Testimony of the Digital Future Coalition before the United States Copyright Office on incidental copies
 Collection of testimony and submissions in Copyright and the NII: Resources for the Library and Education Community, Association of Research Libraries (May 1996)

Members 
Membership rosters drawn from public comments and filings, but changed over time.

Notes

External links
 Archives of the DFC.org website at the Internet Archive; the domain was eventually taken over by an unrelated dance organization after the Digital Future Coalition ceased operations.

Copyright law organizations
Organizations established in 1995
Organizations based in the United States
Organizations disestablished in the 21st century